Patrick Henry Pierce O'Sullivan (born April 1949) is an Irish businessman, the chairman of Old Mutual.

Patrick O'Sullivan was born in April 1949. He has a bachelor's degree in Business Studies from Trinity College, Dublin, and a master's degree in Accounting and Finance from the London School of Economics (LSE).

He has been the chairman of Old Mutual since 1 January 2010, and a non-executive director of COFRA Group in Switzerland, Man Group plc and Bank of Ireland.

References

1949 births
Irish businesspeople
Living people
Alumni of Trinity College Dublin
Alumni of the London School of Economics